PZL.53 Jastrząb II (hawk) was a project of Polish pre-war fighter aircraft developed from PZL.50 Jastrząb and designed by Wsiewołod Jakimiuk of the PZL works. A single-seat low-wing monoplane was to serve as a multi-purpose fighter and escort and reinforcement for PZL.50 Jastrząb in the Polish Air Force.

Initial design was prepared in 1939 and was based on PZL.50 Jastrząb but aircraft had greater bomb load (300 kg compared to 100 kg in PZL.50) and two additional 20 mm guns. Aircraft was designed for much stronger 1200-1300 hp engine chosen from PZL Bristol Herkules III, PZL Waran, Pratt-Whitney or Gnome-Rhône 14R4 engines.

Versions
PZL.53A
First production variant powered by a  engine.
PZL.53B
Development of the PZL.50B powered by Gnome-Rhône 14R-4 engine.

Operators (planned)

Polish Air Force

Specifications (PZL.53)

See also

References

Notes

Bibliography

 Glass, Andrzej. Polskie Konstrukcje Lotnicze Vol.3 (In Polish). Sandomierz, Poland: Wydawnictwo Stratus, 2008.

1930s Polish fighter aircraft
World War II Polish fighter aircraft
PZL aircraft
Low-wing aircraft